The 2017 Pirelli World Challenge was the 28th running of the Pirelli World Challenge. Álvaro Parente was the defending champion in the highest class, the GT class. It was the first season sanctioned by the United States Auto Club, after being under Sports Car Club of America sanctioning for the previous 27 seasons.

Schedule
The calendar was revealed on 13 October 2016. The season comprised eleven rounds, with several rounds in support of the IndyCar Series. All tracks from the previous season returned on the schedule except for Barber Motorsports Park, which was replaced by Virginia International Raceway.

Entry list

GT/GTA/GT Cup

GTS/GTSA

TC/TCA/TCB

Notes
 – Drivers with an asterisk in the "Rounds" column took part in the non-championship round at Road America.

Race results

Championship standings

Drivers' championships
Championship points were awarded for the first twenty positions in each race. The pole-sitter also received one point with the exception of the GTA and GTSA classes. Entries were required to complete 50% of the winning car's race distance in order to be classified and earn points.

GT

GTA

GT Cup

GTS

GTSA

TC/TCA/TCB

Manufacturers' championships
Only those manufacturers who are SCCA Pro Racing corporate members were eligible to receive points toward the Manufacturers' championship. Points were awarded based on finishing positions as shown in the chart below. Only the highest finishing car of each eligible manufacturer earned points for its finishing position.

GT

GTS

TC/TCA

Notes

References

External links

GT World Challenge America
Pirelli World Challenge